Alexandra Rotan (born 29 June 1996) is a Norwegian singer. Rotan began her career as a child singer, becoming a superfinalist in Melodi Grand Prix Junior 2010 with the song "Det vi vil". She later joined the group Keiino in 2018, and represented Norway in the Eurovision Song Contest 2019 with the song "Spirit in the Sky", placing sixth. She had previously competed in Melodi Grand Prix 2018 in a duet with Stella Mwangi, placing third.

Biography
Rotan competed in MGPjr 2010 with the song "Det vi vil" ("What we want"), where she reached the superfinal, and in  Melodi Grand Prix 2018 along with Stella Mwangi performing the song "You Got Me", which came third.

Rotan competed on Norwegian Idol in 2016, which was broadcast on TV 2, but she was eliminated in the semifinal rounds. In 2017, Rotan joined Alan Walker on his European tour.

Rotan represented Norway in the Eurovision Song Contest 2019 as part of the group KEiiNO with the song "Spirit in the Sky".

In 2022, during a tour of Australia with KEiiNO, Rotan was admitted to hospital due to an infected koala scratch.

Discography 
Albums

As part of Keiino

 "OKTA" (2020)

Singles

As lead artist 
"Det vi vil" (2010)
"You Got Me" with Stella Mwangi (2018)
"Crazy 'Bout U" (2018)

As featured artist 
"Need You" - Alphabeat featuring Alexandra Rotan (2016)
"Fargene i meg" - Chris Baco featuring Alexandra Rotan (2016)
"Crzy" - Marius featuring Alexandra Rotan (2017)
"F.I.L" - Stella Mwangi featuring Alexandra Rotan (2018)
"Into You" - HOURS featuring Alexandra Rotan (2019)

As part of Keiino 
"Spirit in the Sky" (2019)
"Shallow" (2019)
"Praying" (2019)
"Vill ha dej" (2019)
"Monument" (2021)
"Drivers Licence" (2021)

References

External links

Living people
1996 births
Musicians from Eidsvoll
Norwegian songwriters
Norwegian pop singers
Idol (Norwegian TV series) participants
Melodi Grand Prix contestants
Eurovision Song Contest entrants for Norway
Eurovision Song Contest entrants of 2019
21st-century Norwegian singers
21st-century Norwegian women singers